St. Rita's College of Balingasag is a Filipino, Roman Catholic, co-educational college in Balingasag, Misamis Oriental, Philippines. It was founded in 1901 by the late Jesuit missionary Rev. Fr. Gregorio Parache, SJ.

History
It started as an elementary parochial school aimed at giving basic Catholic education to the children belonging to the parish. Among its first teachers were the four RVM Sisters namely: S. Ma. Marciana de Leon, RVM, S. Ma. Dominga de Jesus, RVM, S. Ma. Andrea Alba, RVM and S. Ma. Maura Lopez, RVM who was sent by Rev. Mother Efigenia Alvarez the Superior General of the Religious of the Virgin Mary (RVM) Congregation.

In 1929, the parochial school had its formal  change of name into St. Rita's School in honor of St. Rita de Cascia, patroness of the parish, thus, it became the first Catholic elementary school in Balingasag. In March 1931, it acquired government recognition with Mr. Alfredo Regalado as the first principal. The Sisters assigned labored zealously to evangelize the pupils as well as the people of the community.

St. Rita's High School 
In 1957 full responsibility to administer the school was given to the RVM Sisters . St. Rita's High School as it was then named was formally turned over by the Jesuits to the RVM Congregation. The change of administrator enabled the Sisters to give the school a face-lift. Necessary facilities were provided for better services to the clientele. But the Elementary Department experienced a setback on July 1, 1963 when the administration voluntarily closed it for lack of enrollees and better facilities.

St. Rita's College 
Realizing the need for a College Department for its high school graduates, the late Sr. Ma. Mercedes de Jesus, RVM, the school's Directress/Principal applied for college courses: Bachelor of Science in Commerce, Bachelor of Science in Secondary Education in 1968 and Bachelor of Arts which was granted government recognition on August 1, 1969. Eventually, the succeeding courses were granted recognition on June 7, 1976. A building was constructed to accommodate the growing number of students. The opening of the college department thereupon changed the name of the school from St. Rita's High School to St. Rita's College.

In 1995, the elementary department was reopened with Grades 1-2 classes. An extension building was constructed on the same year. The Computer Secretarial Course was granted government recognition on April 1, 1996. The Bachelor of Elementary Education Course was granted government recognition on September 16, 1996.

A new name, St. Rita's College of Balingasag (SRCB) was given after it acquired 50 years of legal entity. A certificate of the New Constitution and By-Laws was granted by the Securities and Exchange Commission. The High School Department was included in the Hall of Fame of Region X as the Best Implementor of the Drug Education Program of the Philippines. Forty-seven (47) international delegates came for a visit during the International Conference of Drug Abuse Prevention on April 27, 1996. SRCB was awarded as the Most Effective Secondary School in Region X. On December 8, 2001, the school closed the Centennial Year Celebration (1901-2001) with a cultural presentation entitled SIGLO participated in by the personnel, students, alumni and parents.

PAASCU Accreditation of the High School Department 
Since quality education is the aim of the RVM Ministry of Education which is also the mandate of RVM Congregation, the SRCB Administration ventured to work for accreditation through a self-survey of the high school department in SY 1995-1996. The PAASCU Preliminary Visit concretized this mandate for quality education on August 11–12, 1997. This significant event was another milestone in the history of SRCB since its goal for quality education was now becoming a reality. The First Formal Visit was done on February 28–29, 2000. This visit granted the high school department a 3-year period as an accredited school. SRCB was again re-visited last February 24–25, 2003 for its re-accreditation and was granted an accredited status for five years until 2008. The visit of the PAASCU Team on September 29–30, 2008 was successful and it gave another milestone of honor for the school when it was granted the certificate of accreditation. This is valid until November 2013. Another certificate was received from the Federation of Accrediting Agencies of the Philippines (FAAP) that grants Level II Re-Accredited Status to the High School Program on January 31, 2009.

Elementary Department Re-opened 
On the other hand, the Elementary Department which was closed voluntarily on July 1, 1972 was re-opened in SY 1995-1996. In SY 1999-2000 SRCB has finally been offering complete Elementary Course. Since then, the Grade School Department population has continuously increased, producing pupils who excel academically and can compete with the graduates of other quality schools.

Service to the Poor and Non-Formal Education 

Generosity in the service of others, especially the poor and concern for the welfare of others are values that are clearly stated in the Mission Statement. To help the academic community go nearer its goals of helping the poor, SRCB adopted two (2) communities as early as 1996-1997, namely Sitio Macario Ladera and Sitio Cala-Cala. However, with the opening of the Mother Ignacia Skills Training Program (MISTP), a non-formal education program for the out-of-school youth (OSY) of the community, the administration decided to adopt only one community, Sitio Macario Ladera, since the latter could already stand on its own. This community was given to the high school department for their area of concern. The college department adopted a Sitio Barangay 6 instead.

The Mother Ignacia Skills Training Program (MISTP) now called RVM- Technical Training Program offers ten-month courses to help the OSY learn skills in Automotive, Electronics, Practical Electricity, Tailoring and Welding for their livelihood. Its operation started in June 1999 and is financially supported by the Mother Ignacia Development Foundation, Inc. (MIDFI).

Aside from these reach-out activities, the Community Extension Service of SRCB extended its expertise through different programs such as SRCB Trisikad Livelihood Project, MISTP Trainers' Financial Loan Program, Micro-Entrepreneurs' Loan Program and Women's Income Generating Program.

The Congregation approved the construction of a new high school building, an Audi-Gym, Sister's Convent and renovation of the grade school building. Blessing of the cornerstone was held on November 12, 2001. The Most Rev. Jesus B. Taquib, DD, blessed these three edifices on November 15, 2002. Construction of covered walk, new school gate, guard house and modern Science Laboratory are among the improvements done in the year 2007 and 2008.

SRCB offers new courses from 2010 until now. Among these are, Bachelor of Science in Criminology, Bachelor of Information Technology and Bachelor of Science in Hotel and Restaurant Management. This only shows that SRCB dreams for a better future of its students.

List of Sections in Grade School Department

List of Sections in High School Department

Courses offered as of June 1995 

SRCB also offers technical courses which is called as "RVM-TTP" or Religious of the Virgin Mary- Technical Training Program.

References

Religious of the Virgin Mary
Universities and colleges in Misamis Oriental